Various newspapers and magazines endorsed candidates in the 2020 United States presidential election, as follows. Tables below also show which candidate each publication endorsed in the 2016 United States presidential election (where known) and include only endorsements for the general election. Primary endorsements are separately listed - see News media endorsements in the 2020 United States presidential primaries.

Daily newspapers

Weekly newspapers

College and university newspapers

High school newspapers

Magazines

Scientific journals

Foreign periodicals

Online news outlets

References

2020 United States presidential election endorsements
2020 in mass media
Newspaper endorsements
2020s politics-related lists